Younis Khan (also spelled as Younus Khan) is a Pakistani cricketer and former captain of the Pakistan national cricket team. He has scored centuries (100 or more runs in a single innings) in Test and One Day International (ODI) matches on thirty-four and seven occasions respectively. He has played 115 Test and 265 ODI matches for Pakistan, scoring 10000+ and 7,249 runs respectively. He was described by the BBC as "a dependable member of the strong Pakistan middle order" and the "most graceful batsman in the side". Former Australian captain Michael Clarke said about him that he was "one of the gentlemen of our game, class player" and "a very good player".

Khan scored a century on his Test debut against Sri Lanka at the Rawalpindi Cricket Stadium in 2000, and became the seventh Pakistan player to achieve this feat. His score of 313, against Sri Lanka at the National Stadium, Karachi in 2009, is the third highest total by a Pakistan batsman in Test cricket and the twentieth highest overall. Khan has scored 34 Test centuries at twenty-one cricket grounds, including 27 at venues outside Pakistan. He scored centuries in both innings of a Test match against Australia in January 2014 becoming seventh Pakistani to achieve the feat.

In Test cricket, Khan is the first Pakistani batsman to score centuries against all the Test cricket playing teams and only cricketer to score to score centuries in eleven countries. He was most successful against Sri Lanka, making eight Test centuries against them. , he is joint sixth-overall among all-time Test century-makers, and top of the equivalent list for Pakistan. In October 2015, Khan became Pakistan's all-time leading run scorer in Test matches, overtaking Javed Miandad's tally of 8,832 runs, while playing against England. He is also the only Pakistani batsman to score over 10,000 Test runs. In August 2016, Khan scored his sixth double century (200 or more runs) during Tests to equal Javed Miandad’s record of scoring the most individual double tons for Pakistan in Test cricket. He also became only the second batsman after Kumar Sangakkara to register six scores of more than 200 against six different countries.

Khan made his ODI debut in February 2000 against Sri Lanka at the National Stadium, Khan's first century came against Hong Kong in July 2004 at the Sinhalese Sports Club Ground, Colombo. His score of 144 is his highest set in an ODI match. , he is tenth in the list of ODI century-makers for Pakistan, a position he shares with Zaheer Abbas. Khan played 25 Twenty20 International (T20I) matches between 2006 and 2010, and never scored a century in the format. His highest score in T20Is remained 51, against Sri Lanka during the 2007 ICC World Twenty20. He announced his retirement from T20Is after winning the 2009 ICC World Twenty20 for Pakistan. , he is jointly twelfth overall among all-time combined century-makers, and top of the equivalent list for Pakistan.

Key 
 *  Remained not out
   Captain in that match
   Man of the match
 (D/L)  Result was determined by the Duckworth–Lewis method

Test cricket centuries

One Day International cricket centuries

Notes

References

General

Specific

External links 
 

Khan
Khan, Younus